Idrottens Hus (Swedish: "The House of Sport") may refer to

 Idrottens Hus (Helsingborg), an arena in Helsingborg, Sweden
 Idrottens Hus (Stockholm), an office building in Stockholm, home of Swedish Sports Confederation and many other Swedish sports governing federations